José Roberto Diniz Aranha (born 2 February 1951 in São Paulo) is a former international freestyle swimmer from Brazil, who competed at two consecutive Summer Olympics for his native country, starting in 1968.

Between 1968 and 1972, he went to live and train in the United States.

At the 1967 Pan American Games, in Winnipeg, he swam the 400-metre freestyle, not reaching the finals.

At the 1968 Summer Olympics, in Mexico City, he swam the 100-metre freestyle and the 4×100-metre medley (along with José Fiolo, João Costa Lima Neto and César Filardi), not reaching the finals.

He was at the 1971 Pan American Games, in Cali, where he won a silver medal in the 100-metre freestyle, and three bronze medals in the three Brazilian relays (4×100-metre freestyle, 4×100-metre medley and 4×200-metre freestyle), breaking the South American record in all three relays.

At the 1972 Summer Olympics, in Munich, he finished 4th in the 4×100-metre freestyle (6 seconds and a half below the South American record), along Ruy de Oliveira, Paulo Zanetti and Paulo Becskehazy, and 5th in the 4×100-metre medley (improving in 5 seconds the South American record), along with Rômulo Arantes, José Fiolo and Sérgio Waismann. He also swam the 100-metre freestyle and the 4×200-metre freestyle, not reaching the finals. In the 4×100-metre medley, Aranha took the relay at 8th place and exceeded 3 countries, finishing in 5th. In the 4×100-metre freestyle, he came in 6th place and closed at 4th, a half second to win the bronze. Despite his great results in the relays, he never was the Brazilian record holder of the 100-metre freestyle.

At the 1973 Summer Universiade, in Moscow, Aranha won a bronze medal in the 4×200-metre freestyle, along with José Namorado, James Huxley Adams and Alfredo Machado.

Participated at the inaugural World Aquatics Championships in 1973 Belgrade, where he finished 5th in the 4×100-metre freestyle, along with Ruy de Oliveira, José Namorado and James Huxley Adams. He also swam the 4×200-metre freestyle, finishing 11th, with the same team.

References

External links 
 
 

1951 births
Living people
Swimmers at the 1967 Pan American Games
Swimmers at the 1968 Summer Olympics
Swimmers at the 1971 Pan American Games
Swimmers at the 1972 Summer Olympics
Olympic swimmers of Brazil
Swimmers from São Paulo
Pan American Games silver medalists for Brazil
Pan American Games bronze medalists for Brazil
Brazilian male freestyle swimmers
Pan American Games medalists in swimming
Universiade medalists in swimming
Universiade bronze medalists for Brazil
Medalists at the 1973 Summer Universiade
Medalists at the 1971 Pan American Games
20th-century Brazilian people
21st-century Brazilian people